The Bolshoy Kinel is a river in Orenburg and Samara Oblasts of Russia.

Along the river are located the towns of Buguruslan, Pokhvistnevo, Otradny and, at the confluence with the Samara, Kinel.

References 

Rivers of Orenburg Oblast
Rivers of Samara Oblast